The Other Woman is a 2009 American drama film written and directed by Don Roos. It is based on the Ayelet Waldman novel Love and Other Impossible Pursuits and stars Natalie Portman, Lisa Kudrow, and Charlie Tahan. It was released in the United Kingdom as Love and Other Impossible Pursuits. It was distributed by IFC Films in the US.

Plot
Emilia (Natalie Portman) is a young lawyer from New York, who in a short time has seen her life come to tragedy: she and her husband Jack (Scott Cohen) have separated following the death of their only daughter, Isabel, from SIDS. Emilia views this loss as a punishment and cannot move on with her life by having more children.

Vilified as a homewrecker, she attracts the unyielding ire of Jack's furious ex-wife, Carolyn (Lisa Kudrow), who is revealed to also be pregnant (after she heard about Emilia's pregnancy, she realized that she too wanted another child). Emilia thinks that this is purely out of spite. Now she must come to terms with her stepson, William (Charlie Tahan), who upsets her with constant references to her late little girl (including saying that under the terms of Jewish law, Isabel did not live long enough to be considered a full human being). Emilia's efforts to bond with William do not go well and succeed only in making both Carolyn and Jack think less of her.

Conquered in her crisis and increasingly unfinished, Emilia finds the courage to tell Jack of the details never confessed about the death of their daughter Isabel. That morning, Emilia did not find her dead in the crib, but on her breast, where most likely the baby girl was suffocated after her mother had fallen asleep. Despite the fact that the couple had called an ambulance, there was nothing left to do. The terrible guilt of having killed her own daughter, is the real cause of her uneasiness.

She moves out, tentatively mends fences with her father (who earlier had cheated on her mother), and joins her old friends at a Legal Aid office. She is surprised when Carolyn calls her and asks her to come by her office. After initially being upset about Emilia moving out, Carolyn admits to telling William there is a possibility Emilia did accidentally kill Isabel because of Emilia's thoughtless ways; Carolyn seems chastened when she adds that her son was angry at her attitude and told her she should be ashamed of herself. She then tells a stunned Emilia that she has personally looked into the autopsy report on Isabel, and she can confirm that Emilia did not kill her baby girl. Emilia starts crying in realization that she has been punishing herself for so long, and that it was not her fault. Emilia later goes to Jack and tells him the full story, and while he tells her at that point that he cannot reconcile with her, a crisis involving Carolyn's City Hall wedding and William leads to Emilia getting through to his son and Jack saying he wants to go on a date with her, leaving Emilia happy and strongly hinting the couple will get back together soon.

On the day that Carolyn's son is born, Emilia takes William to the park and gives him a boat that was given to her when she was his age, she then says, "I love you William" and he replies "I know." He looks at her and away again and says, "Me too." The film ends with a montage of pictures and art, showing the various figures in the story.

Cast
 Natalie Portman as Emilia Greenleaf
 Lisa Kudrow as Dr. Carolyn Soule
 Scott Cohen as Jack Woolf
 Charlie Tahan as William Woolf
 Lauren Ambrose as Mindy
 Kendra Kassebaum as Sharlene
 Daisy Tahan as Emma
 Anthony Rapp as Simon
 Elizabeth Marvel as Pia
 Debra Monk as Laura
 Maria Dizzia as Jamie Brennan
 Mona Lerche as Sonia
 Mary Joy as Marilyn

Release
Post-production was completed in 2009 and the movie was released 2011.

Reception
The film received mainly negative reviews from critics. Review aggregator website Rotten Tomatoes reported that 39% of 46 of its critics gave positive reviews, with an average rating of 5.5/10. The website's consensus reads, "Natalie Portman and Lisa Kudrow deliver fine performances in The Other Woman, but they're muted by Don Roos' clumsy direction and cluttered, melodramatic script." Metacritic, which assigns a weighted average score out of 100 to reviews from mainstream critics, gives the film a score of 37 based on 16 reviews, which is interpreted as "Generally unfavorable" by Metacritic.

References

External links
 
 

2009 films
2009 drama films
Adultery in films
American drama films
Films based on American novels
Films directed by Don Roos
Films produced by Marc E. Platt
Films scored by John Swihart
Films with screenplays by Don Roos
IFC Films films
2000s English-language films
2000s American films